Radio Kuku (also called Kuku-raadio) is an Estonian radio station. It was the first politically independent privately owned radio station in post-occupation Estonia, established in 1992 by a media businessman and later politician Rein Lang and a founder of the first politically independent newspaper Eesti Ekspress, Hans H. Luik.

In the winter of 2014, Kuku had 144,000 regular listeners and was the most popular private radio station in Estonia among the Estonian-speaking population. Almost 80,000 people regularly listen to Kuku's morning and afternoon program. Almost 40 percent of Kuku's listeners have higher education and 60 percent live in cities.

See also 
 Keskpäevatund

References

External links 
 Real-time webcast in Flash format
  
 web archive of recorded programmes since late 2001 in Microsoft format.

Radio stations in Estonia
Radio stations established in 1992
1992 establishments in Estonia
Mass media in Tallinn